The Guerpont Autoplum is a French ultralight aircraft that was designed by Maurice Guerpont. Plans are supplied by one of the first builders of the type, Roland Mangeard of Pulnoy. The aircraft is supplied as plans only for amateur construction.

Design and development
The aircraft was designed to comply with the Fédération Aéronautique Internationale microlight rules. It features a cantilever low-wing, a two-seats-in-side-by-side configuration enclosed cockpit under an aircraft canopy with gull winged doors for access, fixed conventional landing gear and a single engine in tractor configuration.

The aircraft is made from wood, with its flying surfaces covered in doped aircraft fabric. The Autoplum's tailplane is 50% the area of the main wing, which provides a wide centre of gravity range and a high degree of pitch dampening. Earlier examples were fitted with a   Rotax 462 two-stroke engine, with later ones using the  Rotax 582 two-stroke powerplant or other engines.

Specifications (Autoplum)

References

External links
Photo of a Guerpont Autoplum

2000s French ultralight aircraft
Homebuilt aircraft
Single-engined tractor aircraft